Bata is both a given name and a surname. Notable people with the name include:

Given name:
 Bata LoBagola (1877–1947), early 20th-century American impostor and entertainer
 Bata Paskaljević (1923–2004), Serbian actor
 Bata Kameni (born 1941), Serbian actor and stunt performer

Nickname:
 Agustín Sauto Arana (1908–1986), Spanish footballer
 Bata Živojinović (born 1933), Serbian actor and politician
 Danilo Stojković (1934–2002), Serbian actor
 Efren Reyes (born 1954), Filipino pool player
 Zoran Mirković (born 1971), Serbian footballer

Surname:
 Tomáš Baťa (1876–1932), Czech shoe company founder
 Jan Antonín Baťa (1898–1965), half-brother of the founder

 István Bata (1910–1982), Hungarian military officer and politician
 Thomas J. Bata (1914–2008), son of the founder